Cristina Pato Lorenzo (born August 17, 1980) is a Galician bagpiper, pianist and composer. She is a member of the Silk Road Ensemble led by Yo-Yo Ma and an educational adviser to the Silk Road Project. In 2017 she was collaborating with Harvard University as one of its Blodgett Distinguished Artists in Residence. Cristina Pato is a member of the Artist Committee of Americans for the Arts and a regular collaborator of the Turnaround Arts educational program of the President's Committee on the Arts and the Humanities.

Music career
Pato received a master's degree in Piano Performance and a master's degree of in Music Theory and Chamber Music from the Conservatori Superior de Música del Liceu in Barcelona. She received a Master of Fine Arts Degree in Digital Arts (Computer Music) from the Universitat Pompeu Fabra in Barcelona. She earned a doctorate of Musical Arts (Collaborative Piano) from Rutgers University's Mason Gross School of the Arts.

Pato is the first female Galician gaita musician to record a solo album. She appeared on the Grammy Award-winning albums Yo-Yo Ma and Friends: Songs of Joy and Peace (2008) and Sing Me Home (2016) and in the documentary The Music of Strangers: Yo-Yo Ma and The Silk Road Ensemble, directed by academy award winner Morgan Neville. She has also worked with Arturo O'Farrill, Paquito D’Rivera, Chicago Symphony Orchestra, and the New York Philharmonic, as well as dancers Damian Woetzel and Lil Buck. [1]

Discography

As leader
 Tolemia (Fonofolk, 1999)
 Xilento (Fonofolk, 2001)
 From Russia to Brazil with Patrice Jegou (Zouma, 2006)
 The Galician Connection (Zouma, 2010)
 Migrations (Sunnyside, 2013)
 Rustica with Davide Salvado, Anxo Pintos, Roberto Comesana (Zouma, 2015)
 Latina, Galician Bagpipes & Piano (Sunnyside, 2015)

See also
 Galician traditional music

References

External links
 Official website
 James R. Oestreich, September 16, 2006 "Revealing the Soul in Soldierly Bagpipes" The New York Times
 Allan Kozinn, August 21, 2007 "Latin Sounds of Many Parts, Even Bagpipes" The New York Times
 Cristina Huete, August 31, 2009 "La nueva Cristina" El Pais 2009 (in Spanish)
 Lara De Meo July 17, 2007 "The many shades of Mason Gross musician Cristina Pato" Rutgers Focus
 Vivien Schweitzer, September 19, 2006 "Lusty or Tranquil in Spirit, but Always Unlikely in Sound" The New York Times

1980 births
Musicians from Galicia (Spain)
Players of Galician bagpipes
Living people
Spanish women musicians
20th-century Spanish musicians
20th-century women musicians
21st-century Spanish musicians
21st-century women musicians
Conservatori Superior de Música del Liceu alumni
Sunnyside Records artists
Castelao Medal recipients
Galician traditional music groups
20th-century Spanish women